Pac-Man is a popular 1980 arcade game by Namco.

Pac-Man may also refer to:

Entertainment
 Pac-Man (character), the titular protagonist of the franchise
 Pac-Man (series), a series of video games
 Pac-Man (Atari 2600), a port of the arcade game for the Atari 2600
 Pac-Man (album), the 1992 EP by Power Pill
 "Pac-Man" ("Weird Al" Yankovic song), a Weird Al parody of "Taxman"
 PAC-MAN (Gorillaz song), a song by Gorillaz featuring Schoolboy Q
 Pac-Man (TV series), a short-lived cartoon series
 Pac-Man and the Ghostly Adventures, an animated television series

People with the nickname
 Manny Pacquiao (born 1978), Filipino boxer and politician
 Adam Jones (American football) (born 1983), National Football League player
 Luděk Pachman (born 1924-died 2003), Czechoslovak-German chessplayer

Other uses
 Pacman (package manager), a package management system of Arch Linux
 Pac-Man (shogi), a trap opening in shogi
 Pacman Nebula or NCG 281, a region of space
 Pac-Man, the codename of a propaganda operation by the South African military to discredit the International Freedom Foundation
 Operation Pacman, a 2002 campaign by the New Zealand Ministry of Fisheries to apprehend poachers
 Pacman (security vulnerability), a flaw in Apple M1 microprocessors

See also
 Da Weasel, including MC PacMan
 Lilac chaser or Pac-Man illusion, an optical phenomenon
 Mr. Pacman, band from Denver, Colorado
 1-Pacman, a Philippine party-list group
 PAC (disambiguation)
 Paceman (disambiguation)
 Pacman conjecture, economic conjecture
 Pac-Man defense, a legal strategy where a smaller company fights off a takeover by purchasing the larger company
 Pacman dysplasia, a lethal autosomal recessive skeletal dysplasia
 Pacman frog or Ceratophrys, a genus of frog
 Pac-Man Fever (disambiguation)
 Pakman
 Parent-Adult-Child, relationship model of Transactional Analysis
 Team Pacman, a wrestling team